Oliver Edward Robinson (born 1 December 1993) is an English professional cricketer who plays internationally for the England Test cricket team. In domestic cricket, he represents Sussex, having previously played for Yorkshire and Hampshire. He made his Test debut in 2021, and plays as a right-arm medium fast bowler.

Domestic career 
Robinson began his career playing for Kent Second XI. After one match of the 2013 season, he left Kent for Leicestershire before playing for Yorkshire Second XI. He finished the 2013 season with 59 wickets and 1,282 runs in Second XI cricket, and made his first-team List A debut for Yorkshire in July 2013 against Leicestershire. In October 2013, Robinson signed a professional contract with Yorkshire.

After making seven T20 Blast appearances for Yorkshire during the 2014 season Robinson was sacked by Yorkshire in July for unprofessional actions, mostly related to poor timekeeping. Later in the 2014 season Robinson made one List A appearance for Hampshire.

In April 2015, Sussex signed Robinson on a short-term deal, after an injury crisis with bowlers Tymal Mills, James Anyon and Lewis Hatchett all unavailable. Robinson had played a Second XI match for Sussex and was named in the squad for a County Championship match the next day against Durham where he made his first-class debut. In the match Robinson, batting at number nine, scored a century in a Sussex record-breaking tenth-wicket partnership with Matt Hobden of 164. In doing so, he became the first Sussex player in 95 years to score a century on their County Championship debut. Robinson took his first five-wicket haul in May 2015 against Warwickshire. In the 2015 season, Robinson took 46 Championship wickets at an average of 24.71, and was nominated for the LV= Breakthrough Player Award and won the Sussex Young Player of the Year award. In October 2015, Robinson signed a new three-year contract with Sussex.

In April 2021, Robinson was named Sussex vice-captain in County Championship matches. That month, he took 9 wickets for 78 runs in a County Championship match against Glamorgan; it was the best bowling figures by an Englishman since 2016.

On 10 June 2021, Robinson announced that he was taking a "short break from the game", with Sussex saying that he would be unavailable for their first two games of the 2021 t20 Blast. In July 2021, Robinson was signed by the Manchester Originals for the 2021 season of The Hundred, as a replacement for Harry Gurney. In April 2022, he was bought by the Manchester Originals for the 2022 season of The Hundred.

International career
On 29 May 2020, Robinson was named in a 55-man group of players to begin training ahead of international fixtures starting in England following the COVID-19 pandemic. On 17 June 2020, he was included in England's 30-man squad to start training behind closed doors for the Test series against the West Indies. On 4 July 2020, Robinson was named as one of the nine reserve players for the first Test match of the series. He was then named in England's squad for the second Test match of the series, his maiden call-up to the senior team. On 12 August 2020, he was also named in England's squad for the second Test against Pakistan.

In December 2020, Robinson was named as one of seven reserve players in England's Test squad for their series against Sri Lanka. In January 2021, he was also named as a reserve player in England's Test squad for their series against India.

In May 2021, Robinson was included in England's Test squad for their series against New Zealand. He made his Test debut on 2 June 2021, for England against New Zealand. His first Test international wicket was Tom Latham. On the day of his international Test debut, Robinson apologised for making racist and sexist tweets in 2012 and 2013. The England and Wales Cricket Board (ECB) launched an investigation, on 3 June 2021, to consider whether Robinson should be sanctioned for the tweets. On 6 June 2021, Robinson was removed from the England squad for the second Test match of the series, and suspended from all formats of international cricket by the ECB. Oliver Dowden, the Secretary of State for Digital, Culture, Media and Sport, described the ECB sanctions as "over the top". He asked the ECB to reconsider the suspension, saying: "They are also a decade old and written by a teenager". Later, British Prime Minister Boris Johnson stated that he agreed with Dowden. On 3 July 2021, Robinson was cleared to return to cricket, following a hearing by the Cricket Discipline Commission. Later the same month, Robinson was named in England's Test squad for their series against India. In the first match, Robinson took his first five-wicket haul in Test cricket, with 5/85. Robinson was England's leading wicket taker in the summer (28 wickets with an average of 19.60); he was named as one of Wisden's five cricketers of the year in April 2022.

Personal life
Robinson was educated at The King's School, Canterbury. He has been coached by his stepfather Paul Farbrace at Sussex.

Notes

References

External links
 

1993 births
Living people
Cricketers from Kent
English cricketers
England Test cricketers
Yorkshire cricketers
Hampshire cricketers
Sussex cricketers
English cricketers of the 21st century
People from Margate
People educated at The King's School, Canterbury
Wisden Cricketers of the Year